MWU may refer to

Merriam-Webster Unabridged, edition of Webster's Dictionary
Midwestern University
Mine Workers' Union, predecessor of Solidarity (South African trade union)